Jeff Collier may refer to:

 Jeffrey Collier, race car driver
 Jeff Collier (Casualty), a fictional character from the BBC television drama Casualty, played by Matt Bardock